Doppler Nunatak is a nunatak lying southwest of Mount Mende in the Sky-Hi Nunataks. It was named by the Advisory Committee on Antarctic Names in 1987 after Christian Doppler, an Austrian scientist who discovered the Doppler effect in physics.

References 

Nunataks of Palmer Land